Marcalgergelyi is a village in Veszprém county, Hungary.

External links
 Street map (Hungarian)
 Explore Marcalgergelyi

Populated places in Veszprém County